Morris Chang (born 10 July 1931) is a Taiwanese-American businessman who built his career in the United States and subsequently in Taiwan. He is the founder, as well as former chairman and CEO, of Taiwan Semiconductor Manufacturing Company (TSMC). He is known as the semiconductor industry founder of Taiwan. As of October 2021, his net worth was estimated at US$2.8 billion.

Biography

Early life in China
Chang was born in the city Ningbo, situated within Chekiang in China, in 1931. When he was young, he wanted to become a novelist or journalist, though his father persuaded him otherwise. However, the elder Chang was an official in charge of finance for the Yin county government and later a bank manager. Due to his father's career change and also the outbreak of the Second Sino-Japanese War, the Chang family lived in Nanjing, Guangzhou, Chongqing and Shanghai. 

Chang spent most of his primary school years in British Hong Kong between the ages of six and eleven. In 1941, the Japanese occupation of Hong Kong began and Chang's family went back to Shanghai and Ningbo to live for a few months, eventually making their way to the temporary capital, Chongqing. In 1948, as China was in the height of the restarted Chinese Civil War, a year before People’s Republic of China (PRC) was established and the Republic of China (ROC)'s retreat to Taiwan, Chang again moved to Hong Kong.

Moving to the United States
In 1949, Chang moved to the United States to attend Harvard University. He transferred to the Massachusetts Institute of Technology in sophomore year and received his bachelor's and master's degrees in mechanical engineering from MIT in 1952 and 1953, respectively. Chang failed two consecutive doctoral qualification examinations and eventually left MIT without obtaining a PhD. In 1955 he was hired by Sylvania Semiconductor, then known as a small semiconductor division of Sylvania Electric Products. 

Three years later, he moved to Texas Instruments in 1958, which was then rapidly rising in its field. After three years at TI, he rose to manager of the engineering section of the company. It was then, in 1961, that TI decided to invest in him by giving him the opportunity to obtain his PhD degree, which he received in electrical engineering from Stanford University in 1964.

During his 25-year career (1958–1983) at Texas Instruments, he rose up in the ranks to become the group vice president responsible for TI's worldwide semiconductor business. He left TI and later became president and chief operating officer of General Instrument Corporation (1984–1985).

Chang worked on a four-transistor project for TI where the manufacturing was done by IBM. This was one of the early semiconductor foundry relationships. Also at TI, Morris pioneered the then controversial idea of pricing semiconductors "ahead of the cost curve", which meant sacrificing early profits ("short term") to gain market share and achieve manufacturing yields that would result in greater profits over an extended timeline ("long-term").

Return
After he left General Instrument Corporation, Sun Yun-suan, Premier of the Republic of China, recruited him to become chairman and president of the Industrial Technology Research Institute in Taiwan, where the ROC is now based having lost the mainland. This marked his return to the ROC, about three decades after he left during the chaotic Chinese Civil War mainly between the PRC and the ROC. 

As head of a government-sponsored non-profit, he was in charge of promoting industrial and technological development in Taiwan. Chang founded TSMC in 1987, the beginning of the period where firms increasingly saw value in outsourcing their manufacturing capabilities to Asia. Soon, TSMC became one of the world's most profitable chip makers. Chang left ITRI in 1994 and became chairman of Vanguard International Semiconductor Corporation from 1994 to 2003 while continuing to serve as chairman of TSMC. In 2005, he handed TSMC's CEO position to Rick Tsai.

In June 2009, Chang returned to the position of TSMC's CEO once again. On June 5, 2018, Chang announced his retirement, succeeded by C.C. Wei as CEO and Mark Liu as chairman. Chang was awarded the Order of Propitious Clouds, First Class in September 2018.

Chang has served as Presidential Envoy of the Republic of China (Taiwan) to APEC several times. He represented Chen Shui-bian in 2006. Tsai Ing-wen appointed Chang to the same role in 2018, 2019, and 2020.

Affiliations
 National Academy of Engineering (US)
 MIT Corporation, MIT's board of trustees, Life Member Emeritus
 Goldman Sachs member of board of directors (2001-2002)
 Advisor to the Office of the President of the Republic of China
 Committee of 100

Honorary doctorates
 National Chengchi University, 2007
 Asia University, Taiwan, 2015

Awards and recognitions
 
 1999, Exemplary Leadership Award from the Fabless Semiconductor Association (now Global Semiconductor Alliance), the first recipient of the award; now the award bears his name, "Dr. Morris Chang Exemplary Leadership Award"
 2000, IEEE Robert N. Noyce Medal for Exceptional Contributions to Microelectronics Industry.
2002 National Academy of Engineering Member
 2005, Nikkei Asia Prize for Regional Growth
 2007, Computer History Museum Fellow Award, for dramatically accelerating the production of semiconductor-based devices and systems by developing an independent semiconductor manufacturing foundry.
 2008  Robert N. Noyce Award from the Semiconductor Industry Association (US) 
 2011, IEEE Medal of Honor.
 2011, Order of Brilliant Star with Grand Cordon from the Republic of China.
 2014 SPIE Visionary Award
 2018, Order of Propitious Clouds with Special Grand Cordon from the Republic of China.

Authored books

References

External links
  • stanfordonline • 1:13:58 • Apr 25, 2014

1931 births
Businesspeople from Ningbo
Chongqing Nankai Secondary School alumni
Nanyang Model High School alumni
Harvard University alumni
Texas Instruments people
Members of Committee of 100
Living people
IEEE Medal of Honor recipients
Members of the United States National Academy of Engineering
Taiwanese mechanical engineers
20th-century Taiwanese businesspeople
Engineers from Zhejiang
Taiwanese chief executives
Senior Advisors to the Office of the President of the Republic of China
Billionaires from Zhejiang
MIT School of Engineering alumni
Stanford University School of Engineering alumni
Taiwanese company founders
Recipients of the Order of Propitious Clouds
Recipients of the Order of Brilliant Star
Winners of the Nikkei Asia Prize
Asia Game Changer Award winners
21st-century Taiwanese businesspeople
American electrical engineers
Taiwanese electrical engineers
20th-century Taiwanese engineers